Love's Conquest is a lost 1918 American silent drama film directed by Edward José and written by Charles E. Whittaker after the play Gismonda by Victorien Sardou. The film stars Lina Cavalieri, Courtenay Foote, Fred Radcliffe, Frank Lee, J.H. Gilmour, and Isabel Berwin. The film was released on May 21, 1918, by Paramount Pictures.

Plot
As described in a film magazine, determined that her son Francesco (Verdi) will have every advantage of a successful reign when he grows to manhood, Duchess Gismonda refuses all offers of marriage. A sudden danger to her son prompts her to offer her kingdom to the man who rescues the child. Almerio (Foote) braves the dangers of the lion's den to save the child, but because he is a slave the Duchess refuses to fulfill her vow. Gradually, she learns to love him, and after he assumes the guilt for a murder that she committed, Gismonda confesses to the crime and in the presence of her people makes Almerio her consort.

Cast
Lina Cavalieri as Gismonda
Courtenay Foote as Almerio
Fred Radcliffe as Prince Zaccaria
Frank Lee as Gregoras
J.H. Gilmour as Bishop
Isabel Berwin as Nurse
Freddie Verdi as Francesco

Reception
Like many American films of the time, Love's Conquest was subject to restrictions and cuts by city and state film censorship boards. For example, the Chicago Board of Censors cut, in Reel 4, the four intertitles "If I accept swear that none shall ever know", "Swear that tomorrow you will release me from every obligation", "Go to your hut this way — at midnight I shall be with you", and "No, if this is to be your recompense, so be it", Almerio embracing Gismonda in hut, removing cloak and opening door to adjoining room, scene of light being extinguished in window, Reel 5, the intertitle "Dawn" and Gismonda leaving hut, the intertitle "Kill him while he sleeps with one blow", actual stabbing, and the intertitle "Keep the crown and give me the woman unknown to all".

References

External links

1918 films
1910s English-language films
Silent American drama films
1918 drama films
Paramount Pictures films
American films based on plays
Films based on works by Victorien Sardou
Films directed by Edward José
American black-and-white films
Lost American films
American silent feature films
1918 lost films
Lost drama films
1910s American films